Jacques Brival (1751–1820) was a French abolitionist. As a member of the National Convention, he also served as a Representative on Mission.

1751 births
1820 deaths
People from Tulle
Members of the Council of Five Hundred
Members of the Legislative Assembly (France)
French abolitionists
Regicides of Louis XVI
Représentants en mission